Frederick Enoch Woodbridge (August 29, 1818 – April 25, 1888) was a nineteenth-century politician and lawyer from Vermont. He served as a U.S. Representative from Vermont.

Biography

Woodbridge was born in Vergennes, Vermont, son of Enoch D. Woodbridge and Clara (Strong) Woodbridge. His grandfather Enoch Woodbridge served as Chief Justice of the Vermont Supreme Court, and his grandfather Samuel Strong and great-grandfather John Strong, were prominent military and political leaders of early Vermont. He graduated from the University of Vermont in 1840. He studied law with his father and was admitted to the bar in 1843. He began the practice of law in Vergennes.

Woodbridge was elected as a city councilor for two years and the mayor of Vergennes for five. He later served as a member of the Vermont House of Representatives in 1849, 1857 and 1858, and was the Vermont Auditor of Accounts from 1850 until 1852. He was a prosecuting attorney from 1854 to 1858. He engaged in the construction of railroads and was vice-president of the Rutland and Washington Railroad. Woodbridge served in the Vermont Senate in 1860 and 1861, serving as president pro tempore in the latter year.

Woodbridge was elected as a Republican to the United States House of Representatives in 1862, serving from 1863 to 1869. He was a major proponent of the Expatriation Act of 1868.

After leaving Congress, he resumed practicing law until his death in Vergennes, Vermont on April 25, 1888. He is interred in Prospect Cemetery in Vergennes.

Personal life
Woodbridge was married to Mary Parkhurst Woodbridge. Their son Enoch Day Woodbridge was a surgeon at Bellevue Hospital.

References

External links
 
 Biographical Directory of the United States Congress: WOODBRIDGE, Frederick Enoch, (1818 - 1888)
 Govtrack.us: Rep. Frederick Woodbridge
 Vermont in the Civil War: Frederick E. Woodbridge
 
 The Political Graveyard: Woodbridge, Frederick Enoch (1818-1888)

1818 births
1888 deaths
Members of the Vermont House of Representatives
Vermont state senators
Presidents pro tempore of the Vermont Senate
Mayors of places in Vermont
State Auditors of Vermont
District attorneys in Vermont
Vermont lawyers
University of Vermont alumni
People of Vermont in the American Civil War
Republican Party members of the United States House of Representatives from Vermont
Vermont National Republicans
19th-century American politicians
People from Vergennes, Vermont
19th-century American lawyers